In enzymology, an anthocyanin 5-O-glucoside 6'''-O-malonyltransferase is an enzyme that catalyzes the chemical reaction

malonyl-CoA + pelargonidin 3-O-(6-caffeoyl-beta-D-glucoside) 5-O-beta-D-glucoside  CoA + 4'''-demalonylsalvianin

Thus, the two substrates of this enzyme are malonyl-CoA and pelargonidin 3-O-(6-caffeoyl-beta-D-glucoside) 5-O-beta-D-glucoside, whereas its two products are CoA and 4'''-demalonylsalvianin.

This enzyme belongs to the family of transferases, specifically those acyltransferases transferring groups other than aminoacyl groups.  The systematic name of this enzyme class is malonyl-CoA:pelargonidin-3-O-(6-caffeoyl-beta-D-glucoside)-5-O-beta- D-glucoside 6'''-O-malonyltransferase.

References

 

EC 2.3.1
Enzymes of unknown structure